Indira Gandhi Rashtriya Manav Sangrahalaya  (IGRMS) or National Museum of Humankind or Museum of Man is an anthropology museum located in Bhopal, India,  to present an integrated story of the evolution of man and culture with special reference to India. It spreads over an area of about 200 acres on the Shyamla Hills in the city. This museum depicts the story of mankind in time and space. Located on Bhopal's upper lake, 'Rashtriya Manav Sangrahalaya' can be accessed either from Lake View Road or from another road near Demonstration School. IGRMS has a few permanent exhibitions, broadly categorized as a) Open-exhibitions, b) Indoor galleries (Veethi-Sankul and Bhopal Gallery) and c) Periodical/ Temporary exhibitions. It also has other exhibitions categorized as 1. Online exhibitions, 2. Travelling  exhibitions, 3. Special  exhibitions and 4. Ongoing  exhibitions.

The following open-air exhibitions partially developed and opened for the public: Tribal Habitat. Coastal Village, Desert Village, Himalayan Village, Mythological Trail, Traditional Technology park.

The museum also has a regional centre for the South India region at Mysore in Karnataka.

Exhibited artworks 
 Khambana Kao Phaba (painting) – from Manipur
 Poubi Lai (sculpture) – from Manipur
 Replica of the Kangla Gate – from Manipur

References

External links
 Official website
 Images of Rashtriya Manav Sangrahalaya

Anthropology museums
National museums of India
Monuments and memorials to Indira Gandhi
Museums in Bhopal